Maryn Jones, known by the stage name Yowler, is an American musician. Jones is the guitarist and lead vocalist of the band All Dogs and formerly a member of the band Saintseneca.

History
Jones released their first album under the name Yowler in 2015, titled The Offer. In 2017, Jones released their second album as Yowler, Black Dog In My Path.

Backing Band

 John Samuels – guitar, casio
 Chelsea Dirck – bass guitar
 Tony Richards – drums

Discography
Studio albums
The Offer (2015, Double Double Whammy)
Black Dog In My Path (2018, Double Double Whammy)

References

Living people
Year of birth missing (living people)
American folk guitarists
American folk singers
American rock guitarists
American women rock singers
21st-century American women